Bagshawe is a surname, and may refer to:

Edward Bagshawe (bishop) (1829–1915), Roman Catholic Bishop of Nottingham
Edward Bagshawe of Finglas (died 1657), knighted in 1627, comptroller of customs, member of parliament
Francis Bagshawe (1832–1896), English landowner who served as High Sheriff of Derbyshire in 1868
Joseph Ridgard Bagshawe (1870–1909), English marine painter and member of the Staithes group
Kenneth Bagshawe CBE, FRS (1925–2022), British oncologist, Emeritus Professor of Medical Oncology, Charing Cross Hospital
Louise Bagshawe or Louise Mensch (born 1971), English author who writes under her maiden name
Tilly Bagshawe (born 1973), British freelance journalist and author
William Bagshawe (1828–1854), English landowner and rower who won the Diamond Challenge Sculls at Henley Royal Regatta in 1848

See also
Mount Bagshawe, southernmost and highest of the Batterbee Mountains, inland from George VI Sound on the west coast of Palmer Land
Bagshawe Glacier drains the northeast slopes of Mount Theodore into Lester Cove, Andvord Bay west of Mount Tsotsorkov, on the west coast of Graham Land, Antarctica
Baghaw
Bagshaw
Bagshaw (surname)
Bashaw (disambiguation)